The 1995 Copa América Final was the final match of the 1995 Copa América. It was held on July 23, 1995, in Montevideo, Uruguay. This was the fourth final for both Uruguay and reigning World Champion Brazil, and the third final featuring the two teams; previously Uruguay had defeated Brazil in 1983, with Brazil returning the favor in 1989 at the Estádio do Maracanã. 

Uruguay won the match 5–3 on penalties, continuing its historic run of winning every international tournament held in Uruguay. This remarkable streak includes South American Championships victories in 1917, 1923, 1924, 1942, 1956, and 1967, and the 1930 FIFA World Cup.

By winning the 1995 Copa América tournament, Uruguay qualified for the 1997 FIFA Confederations Cup.

Route to the final

Match

Details 

|valign="top" width="50%"|

|}

1
Uruguay national football team matches
Brazil national football team matches
Copa
Copa América finals
Copa America Final 1995
 
Sports competitions in Montevideo
1990s in Montevideo
Brazil–Uruguay football rivalry
July 1995 sports events in South America